Matron is the job title of a very senior or the chief nurse in several countries, including the United Kingdom, and other Commonwealth countries and former colonies.

Etymology

The chief nurse, in other words the person in charge of nursing in a hospital and the head of the nursing staff, is also known as the Chief Nursing officer or Chief Nursing Executive, senior nursing officer, matron,  nursing officer, or clinical nurse manager in UK English; the head nurse or director of nursing in US English, and the nursing superintendent or matron in Indian English, among other countries in the Commonwealth of Nations.

In the United Kingdom, matrons today "have powers over budgets, catering and cleaning as well as being in charge of nurses and doctors" and "have the powers to withhold payments from catering and cleaning services if they don't think they are giving the best service to the NHS." Historically, matrons supervised the hospital as a whole but today, they are in-charge of supervising two or three wards.

The chief nurse is a registered nurse who supervises the care of all the patients at a health care facility. The chief nurse is the senior nursing management position in an organization and often holds executive titles like chief nursing officer (CNO), chief nurse executive, or vice-president of nursing.  They typically report to the CEO or COO.

In the United States a matron is not a nurse, but a female assistant to males running a residential facility, like a camp, boarding school, or prison (see Other uses, below).

The word "matron" is derived from the Latin for "mother", via French.

History
The matron was once the most senior nurse in a hospital (in the United Kingdom before  1972). They were responsible for all the nurses and domestic staff, overseeing all patient care, and the efficient running of the hospital, although she almost never had real power over the strategic running of the hospital. Matrons were almost invariably female—male nurses were not at all common, especially in senior positions.  They were often seen as fearsome administrators, but were respected by nurses and doctors alike. Matrons also worked in boarding schools in the UK from the 1950s to 1990s, they acted to same way with the students as they did with nurses with one exception, they had to assign chores to students by the Headteacher when they misbehaved as a punishment such as doing the laundry, cleaning brass work or cleaning the floor. The matron also checked that all students were dressed in the way the uniform policy stated as well as having them make their beds in the same way as hospital beds.

The National Health Service matron became memorably associated with the formidable character in the film Carry On Nurse in 1959 and  Carry On Doctor in 1963 (and gentler portrayals in Carry On Again Doctor and Carry On Matron) and played by Hattie Jacques. The matron usually had a very distinctive uniform, with a dark blue dress (although often of a slightly different colour from those worn by her direct subordinates, the sisters) and an elaborate headdress.

Contemporary matrons
In 2001 the British Government announced the return of the matron to the NHS, electing to call this new breed of nurses "modern matrons," in response to various press complaints of dirty, ineffective hospitals with poorly disciplined staff.

They are not intended to have the same level of responsibility as the old matrons, as they often oversee just one department (therefore a hospital may have many matrons—one for surgery, one for medicine, one for geriatrics, one for the Emergency  department, etc.) but do have budgetary control regarding catering and cleaning contracts. In larger hospitals some will have a group of wards to manage.

Their managerial powers are more limited, and they spend most of their time on administrative work rather than having direct responsibility for patient care.

Many areas of the UK now employ Community Matrons. The role of this staff group is predominantly Clinical and these Matrons have a caseload of patients for whom they are clinically responsible. Many of these patients have chronic health conditions such as COPD, Emphysema, and/or palliative conditions which result in multiple hospital admissions. It is the aim of this staff group to treat the patient within the community thereby limiting hospital admissions. This staff group are predominantly Nurses, but there are other Allied Health Professionals also in the role such as Paramedics and Occupational Therapists.

The nursing branches of the British Armed Forces have never abandoned the term "Matron", and it is used for male as well as female officers, usually holding the rank of Major (or equivalent) or above. It was formerly used as an actual rank in the nursing services.

In South Africa and its former mandated territory South-West Africa (today's Namibia), Matron is the rank of the most senior nurse of a hospital.

Other uses
Long before women were commonly employed as fully sworn police officers, many police forces employed uniformed women with limited powers to search and attend to female prisoners and deal with matters specifically affecting women and children. These female officers were often known as "police matrons". Officers in women's prisons sometimes also used the title of "matron"; sometimes the matron was a senior officer who supervised the other wardresses.

Institutions such as children's homes and workhouses were also run by matrons. The matron of a workhouse was very often the wife of the master and looked after the domestic affairs of the establishment. This was, in fact, the original meaning of the term. Its use in hospitals was borrowed from workhouses.

The term was also used in boarding schools (and is still used in some British independent schools) for the woman in charge of domestic affairs in a boarding house or the school nurse. In the past, the matron was sometimes the wife of the housemaster.

In the Church of Jesus Christ of Latter-day Saints, the female spouse of a temple president or his counselors is referred to as a temple matron.

In New York City, movie theater matrons were employed beginning in 1936 to ensure that children would behave in theaters. They were licensed by the Department of Health until 1943, and the ordinance that required their hiring and selection was formally repealed by the city in 1995.

References

Nursing in the United Kingdom